XHFU-FM 103.3/XEFU-AM 630 is a combo radio station in Cosamaloapan, Veracruz, Mexico. It is known as La FU and is owned by Grupo Emisoras de Sotavento.

History
The concession for 630 AM was awarded in May 1955 to Arnulfo Aguirre Salamanca; the station signed on December 5 of that year with 100 watts of power. It would boost its power to 5,000 watts in 1966.

1994 saw the station become an AM-FM combo.

References

1955 establishments in Mexico
Radio stations established in 1955
Radio stations in Veracruz
Regional Mexican radio stations
Spanish-language radio stations